The Fornaretto of Venice (Italian: Il fornaretto di Venezia) is a 1939 Italian historical drama film directed by Duilio Coletti and starring Roberto Villa, Elsa De Giorgi and Clara Calamai. It is an adaptation of the 1846 play of the same title by Francesco Dall'Ongaro, which has been adapted into films on several occasions. It was made at the Cinecittà Studios in Rome.

Cast 
 Roberto Villa as Piero Tasca, il Fornaretto 
 Elsa De Giorgi as Annetta 
 Clara Calamai as Olimpia Zeno 
 Osvaldo Valenti as Alvise Duodo 
 Enrico Glori as Lorenzo Loredano
 Gero Zambuto as Tasca, il fornaio 
 Carlo Tamberlani as Mocenigo 
 Letizia Bonini as Elena Loredano 
 Ermanno Roveri as Tonin 
 Renato Chiantoni as Il sarto testimone al processo 
 Pietro Germi as Frate domenicano 
 Cesare Polacco as Barnaba 
 Stefano Sibaldi as Il parucchiere di Elena 
 Mario Ersanilli
 Carlo Mariotti
 Cesare Zoppetti

References

Bibliography 
 Forgacs, David & Gundle, Stephen. Mass Culture and Italian Society from Fascism to the Cold War. Indiana University Press, 2007.

External links 
 

1939 films
1930s Italian-language films
Films directed by Duilio Coletti
Italian films based on plays
Films set in Venice
Films set in the 16th century
1930s historical drama films
Italian historical drama films
Films shot at Cinecittà Studios
Italian black-and-white films
1939 drama films
1930s Italian films